Gruznishchevo is a rural locality (a village) in Mardengskoye Rural Settlement, Velikoustyugsky District, Vologda Oblast, Russia. The population was 8 as of 2002. There are 8 streets.

Geography 
Gruznishchevo is located 7 km northwest of Veliky Ustyug (the district's administrative centre) by road. Ishutino is the nearest rural locality.

References 

Rural localities in Velikoustyugsky District